Rimša is the masculine form of a Lithuanian family name. Polish version: Rymsza, Russian/Ukrainian: Rimsha, Belarusian: Rymsha.)  Its feminine forms  are: Rimšienė (married woman or widow) and Rimšaitė (unmarried woman). Notable people with the surname include:

Edmundas Rimša (born 1948), Lithuanian historian
Petras Rimša (1881–1961), Lithuanian sculptor
Fyodor Rimsha (1891–1942), Russian Olympic football (soccer) player
Andrey Rymsha (ca. 1550–1599), Belarusian poet of the Grand Duchy of Lithuania
Filip Jan Rymsza (born 1977), Polish-born American filmmaker and writer
Donata Rimšaitė (born 1988), female Lithuanian modern pentathlete 
Vilma Rimšaitė (born 1983), Lithuanian female Olympic BMX cyclist

Lithuanian-language surnames